Stress, either physiological, biological or psychological, is an organism's response to a stressor such as an environmental condition. Stress is the body's method of reacting to a condition such as a threat, challenge or physical and psychological barrier. There are two hormones that an individual produces during a stressful situation, these are well known as adrenaline and cortisol. There are two kinds of stress hormone levels. Resting (basal) cortisol levels are normal everyday quantities that are essential for standard functioning. Reactive cortisol levels are increases in cortisol in response to stressors. Stimuli that alter an organism's environment are responded to by multiple systems in the body. In humans and most mammals, the autonomic nervous system and hypothalamic-pituitary-adrenal (HPA) axis are the two major systems that respond to stress.

The sympathoadrenal medullary (SAM) axis may activate the fight-or-flight response through the sympathetic nervous system, which dedicates energy to more relevant bodily systems to acute adaptation to stress, while the parasympathetic nervous system returns the body to homeostasis. 

The second major physiological stress-response center, the HPA axis, regulates the release of cortisol, which influences many bodily functions such as metabolic, psychological and immunological functions. The SAM and HPA axes are regulated by several brain regions, including the limbic system, prefrontal cortex, amygdala, hypothalamus, and stria terminalis. Through these mechanisms, stress can alter memory functions, reward, immune function, metabolism and susceptibility to diseases. 

Disease risk is particularly pertinent to mental illnesses, whereby chronic or severe stress remains a common risk factor for several mental illnesses.

Psychology

Acute stressful situations where the stress experienced is severe is a cause of change psychologically to the detriment of the well-being of the individual, such that symptomatic derealization and depersonalization, and anxiety and hyperarousal, are experienced. The International Classification of Diseases includes a group of mental and behavioral disorders which have their aetiology in reaction to severe stress and the consequent adaptive response. Chronic stress, and a lack of coping resources available, or used by an individual, can often lead to the development of psychological issues such as delusions, depression and anxiety (see below for further information). Chronic stress also causes brain atrophy, which is the loss of neurons and the connections between them. It affects the part of the brain that is important for learning, responding to the stressors and cognitive flexibility.

Chronic stressors may not be as intense as acute stressors such as natural disaster or a major accident, but persist over longer periods of time, tend to have a more negative effect on health because they are sustained and thus require the body's physiological response to occur daily. This depletes the body's energy more quickly and usually occurs over long periods of time, especially when these microstressors cannot be avoided (i.e. stress of living in a dangerous neighborhood). See allostatic load for further discussion of the biological process by which chronic stress may affect the body. For example, studies have found that caregivers, particularly those of dementia patients, have higher levels of depression and slightly worse physical health than non-caregivers.

When humans are under chronic stress, permanent changes in their physiological, emotional, and behavioral responses may occur. Chronic stress can include events such as caring for a spouse with dementia, or may result from brief focal events that have long term effects, such as experiencing a sexual assault. Studies have also shown that psychological stress may directly contribute to the disproportionately high rates of coronary heart disease morbidity and mortality and its etiologic risk factors. Specifically, acute and chronic stress have been shown to raise serum lipids and are associated with clinical coronary events.

However, it is possible for individuals to exhibit hardiness—a term referring to the ability to be both chronically stressed and healthy. Even though psychological stress is often connected with illness or disease, most healthy individuals can still remain disease-free after being confronted with chronic stressful events. This suggests that there are individual differences in vulnerability to the potential pathogenic effects of stress; individual differences in vulnerability arise due to both genetic and psychological factors. In addition, the age at which the stress is experienced can dictate its effect on health. Research suggests chronic stress at a young age can have lifelong effects on the biological, psychological, and behavioral responses to stress later in life.

Etymology and historical usage
The term "stress" had none of its contemporary connotations before the 1920s. It is a form of the Middle English destresse, derived via Old French from the Latin stringere, "to draw tight". The word had long been in use in physics to refer to the internal distribution of a force exerted on a material body, resulting in strain. In the 1920s and '30s, biological and psychological circles occasionally used the term to refer to a mental strain or to a harmful environmental agent that could cause illness.

Walter Cannon used it in 1926 to refer to external factors that disrupted what he called homeostasis. But "...stress as an explanation of lived experience is absent from both lay and expert life narratives before the 1930s". Physiological stress represents a wide range of physical responses that occur as a direct effect of a stressor causing an upset in the homeostasis of the body. Upon immediate disruption of either psychological or physical equilibrium the body responds by stimulating the nervous, endocrine, and immune systems. The reaction of these systems causes a number of physical changes that have both short- and long-term effects on the body.

The Holmes and Rahe stress scale was developed as a method of assessing the risk of disease from life changes. The scale lists both positive and negative changes that elicit stress. These include things such as a major holiday or marriage, or death of a spouse and firing from a job.

Biological need for equilibrium
Homeostasis is a concept central to the idea of stress. In biology, most biochemical processes strive to maintain equilibrium (homeostasis), a steady state that exists more as an ideal and less as an achievable condition. Environmental factors, internal or external stimuli, continually disrupt homeostasis; an organism's present condition is a state of constant flux moving about a homeostatic point that is that organism's optimal condition for living. Factors causing an organism's condition to diverge too far from homeostasis can be experienced as stress. A life-threatening situation such as a major physical trauma or prolonged starvation can greatly disrupt homeostasis. On the other hand, an organism's attempt at restoring conditions back to or near homeostasis, often consuming energy and natural resources, can also be interpreted as stress. The brain cannot sustain a concentrated equilibrium under chronic stress, overtime if you constantly struggle in a simmering sea of stress, and you body budget accrued an ever-deepening deficit, that's called chronic stress and it does more than just make you miserable in that moment, It can and will gradually eat away at your brain and cause illness in your body. 

The ambiguity in defining this phenomenon was first recognized by Hans Selye (1907–1982) in 1926. In 1951 a commentator loosely summarized Selye's view of stress as something that "...in addition to being itself, was also the cause of itself, and the result of itself".

First to use the term in a biological context, Selye continued to define stress as "the non-specific response of the body to any demand placed upon it". Neuroscientists such as Bruce McEwen and Jaap Koolhaas believe that stress, based on years of empirical research, "should be restricted to conditions where an environmental demand exceeds the natural regulatory capacity of an organism". The brain cannot live in an harsh family environment, it needs some sort of stability between another brain. People who have reported being raised in harsh environments such as verbal and physical aggression have showed a more immune dysfunction and more metabolic dysfunction.  Indeed, in 1995 Toates already defined stress as a "chronic state that arises only when defense mechanisms are either being chronically stretched or are actually failing," while according to Ursin (1988) stress results from an inconsistency between expected events ("set value") and perceived events ("actual value") that cannot be resolved satisfactorily, which also puts stress into the broader context of cognitive-consistency theory.

Biological background
Stress can have many profound effects on the human biological systems. Biology primarily attempts to explain major concepts of stress using a stimulus-response paradigm, broadly comparable to how a psychobiological sensory system operates. The central nervous system (brain and spinal cord) plays a crucial role in the body's stress-related mechanisms. Whether one should interpret these mechanisms as the body's response to a stressor or embody the act of stress itself is part of the ambiguity in defining what exactly stress is.

The central nervous system works closely with the body's endocrine system to regulate these mechanisms. The sympathetic nervous system becomes primarily active during a stress response, regulating many of the body's physiological functions in ways that ought to make an organism more adaptive to its environment. Below there follows a brief biological background of neuroanatomy and neurochemistry and how they relate to stress.

Stress, either severe, acute stress or chronic low-grade stress may induce abnormalities in three principal regulatory systems in the body: serotonin systems, catecholamine systems, and the hypothalamic-pituitary-adrenocortical axis. Aggressive behavior has also been associated with abnormalities in these systems.

Biology of stress

The brain endocrine interactions are relevant in the translation of stress into physiological and psychological changes. The autonomic nervous system (ANS), as mentioned above, plays an important role in translating stress into a response. The ANS responds reflexively to both physical stressors (for example baroreception), and to higher level inputs from the brain.

The ANS is composed of the parasympathetic nervous system and sympathetic nervous system, two branches that are both tonically active with opposing activities. The ANS directly innervates tissue through the postganglionic nerves, which is controlled by preganglionic neurons originating in the intermediolateral cell column. The ANS receives inputs from the medulla, hypothalamus, limbic system, prefrontal cortex, midbrain and monoamine nuclei.

The activity of the sympathetic nervous system drives what is called the "fight or flight" response. The fight or flight response to emergency or stress involves mydriasis, increased heart rate and force contraction, vasoconstriction, bronchodilation, glycogenolysis, gluconeogenesis, lipolysis, sweating, decreased motility of the digestive system, secretion of the epinephrine and cortisol from the adrenal medulla, and relaxation of the bladder wall. The parasympathetic nervous response, "rest and digest", involves return to maintaining homeostasis, and involves miosis, bronchoconstriction, increased activity of the digestive system, and contraction of the bladder walls. Complex relationships between protective and vulnerability factors on the effect of childhood home stress on psychological illness, cardiovascular illness and adaption have been observed. ANS related mechanisms are thought to contribute to increased risk of cardiovascular disease after major stressful events.

The HPA axis is a neuroendocrine system that mediates a stress response. Neurons in the hypothalamus, particularly the paraventricular nucleus, release vasopressin and corticotropin releasing hormone, which travel through the hypophysial portal vessel where they travel to and bind to the corticotropin-releasing hormone receptor on the anterior pituitary gland. Multiple CRH peptides have been identified, and receptors have been identified on multiple areas of the brain, including the amygdala. CRH is the main regulatory molecule of the release of ACTH.

The secretion of ACTH into systemic circulation allows it to bind to and activate Melanocortin receptor, where it stimulates the release of steroid hormones. Steroid hormones bind to glucocorticoid receptors in the brain, providing negative feedback by reducing ACTH release. Some evidence supports a second long term feedback that is non-sensitive to cortisol secretion. The PVN of the hypothalamus receives inputs from the nucleus of the solitary tract, and lamina terminalis. Through these inputs, it receives and can respond to changes in blood.

The PVN innervation from the brain stem nuclei, particularly the noradrenergic nuclei stimulate CRH release. Other regions of the hypothalamus both directly and indirectly inhibit HPA axis activity. Hypothalamic neurons involved in regulating energy balance also influence HPA axis activity through the release of neurotransmitters such as neuropeptide Y, which stimulates HPA axis activity. Generally, the amygdala stimulates, and the prefrontal cortex and hippocampus attenuate, HPA axis activity; however, complex relationships do exist between the regions.

The immune system may be heavily influenced by stress. The sympathetic nervous system innervates various immunological structures, such as bone marrow and the spleen, allowing for it to regulate immune function. The adrenergic substances released by the sympathetic nervous system can also bind to and influence various immunological cells, further providing a connection between the systems. The HPA axis ultimately results in the release of cortisol, which generally has immunosuppressive effects. However, the effect of stress on the immune system is disputed, and various models have been proposed in an attempt to account for both the supposedly "immunodeficiency" linked diseases and diseases involving hyper activation of the immune system. One model proposed to account for this suggests a push towards an imbalance of cellular immunity(Th1) and humoral immunity(Th2). The proposed imbalance involved hyperactivity of the Th2 system leading to some forms of immune hypersensitivity, while also increasing risk of some illnesses associated with decreased immune system function, such as infection and cancer.

Effects of chronic stress

Chronic stress is a term sometimes used to differentiate it from acute stress. Definitions differ, and may be along the lines of continual activation of the stress response, stress that causes an allostatic shift in bodily functions, or just as "prolonged stress". For example, results of one study demonstrated that individuals who reported relationship conflict lasting one month or longer have a greater risk of developing illness and show slower wound healing. It can also reduce the benefits of receiving common vaccines. Similarly, the effects that acute stressors have on the immune system may be increased when there is perceived stress and/or anxiety due to other events. For example, students who are taking exams show weaker immune responses if they also report stress due to daily hassles. While responses to acute stressors typically do not impose a health burden on young, healthy individuals, chronic stress in older or unhealthy individuals may have long-term effects that are detrimental to health.

Immunological
Acute time-limited stressors, or stressors that lasted less than two hours, results in an up regulation of natural immunity and down regulation of specific immunity. This type of stress saw in increase in granulocytes, natural killer cells, IgA, Interleukin 6, and an increase in cell cytotoxicity. Brief naturalistic stressors elicit a shift from Th1(cellular) to Th2(humoral) immunity, while decreased T-cell proliferation, and natural killer cell cytotoxicity. Stressful event sequences did not elicit a consistent immune response; however, some observations such as decreased T-Cell proliferation and cytotoxicity, increase or decrease in natural killer cell cytotoxicity, and an increase in mitogen PHA. Chronic stress elicited a shift toward Th2 immunity, as well as decreased interleukin 2, T cell proliferation, and antibody response to the influenza vaccine. Distant stressors did not consistently elicit a change in immune function. Another response to high impacts of chronic stress that lasts for a long period of time, is more immune dysfunction and more metabolic dysfunction. It is proven in studies that when continuously being in stressful situations, it is more likely to get sick. Also when being exposed to stress, your body metabolizes the food in a certain way that adds extra calories to your meal, regardless of the nutritional values of the food.

Infectious
Some studies have observed increased risk of upper respiratory tract infection during chronic life stress. In patients with HIV, increased life stress and cortisol was associated with poorer progression of HIV. Also with an increased level of stress, studies have proven evidence that it can reactivate latent herpes viruses.

Chronic disease
A link has been suggested between chronic stress and cardiovascular disease. Stress appears to play a role in hypertension, and may further predispose people to other conditions associated with hypertension. Stress may precipitate abuse of drugs and/or alcohol. Stress may also contribute to aging and chronic diseases in aging, such as depression and metabolic disorders.

The immune system also plays a role in stress and the early stages of wound healing. It is responsible for preparing the tissue for repair and promoting recruitment of certain cells to the wound area. Consistent with the fact that stress alters the production of cytokines, Graham et al. found that chronic stress associated with care giving for a person with Alzheimer's disease leads to delayed wound healing. Results indicated that biopsy wounds healed 25% more slowly in the chronically stressed group, or those caring for a person with Alzheimer's disease.

Development
Chronic stress has also been shown to impair developmental growth in children by lowering the pituitary gland's production of growth hormone, as in children associated with a home environment involving serious marital discord, alcoholism, or child abuse.  Chronic stress also has a lot of illnesses and health care problems other then mental that comes with it. Severe chronic stress for long periods of time can lead to an increased chance of catching illnesses such as diabetes, cancer, depression, heart disease and Alzheimer's disease.  More generally, prenatal life, infancy, childhood, and adolescence are critical periods in which the vulnerability to stressors is particularly high. This can lead to psychiatric and physical diseases which have long term impacts on an individual.

Psychopathology
Chronic stress is seen to affect the parts of the brain where memories are processed through and stored. When people feel stressed, stress hormones get over-secreted, which affects the brain. This secretion is made up of glucocorticoids, including cortisol, which are steroid hormones that the adrenal gland releases, although this can increase storage of flashbulb memories it decreases long-term potentiation (LTP). The hippocampus is important in the brain for storing certain kinds of memories and damage to the hippocampus can cause trouble in storing new memories but old memories, memories stored before the damage, are not lost. Also high cortisol levels can be tied to the deterioration of the hippocampus and decline of memory that many older adults start to experience with age. These mechanisms and processes may therefore contribute to age-related disease, or originate risk for earlier-onset disorders. For instance, extreme stress (e.g. trauma) is a requisite factor to produce stress-related disorders such as post-traumatic stress disorder.

Chronic stress also shifts learning, forming a preference for habit based learning, and decreased task flexibility and spatial working memory, probably through alterations of the dopaminergic systems. Stress may also increase reward associated with food, leading to weight gain and further changes in eating habits. Stress may contribute to various disorders, such as fibromyalgia, chronic fatigue syndrome, depression, as well as other mental illnesses and functional somatic syndromes.

Psychological concepts

Eustress
Selye published in year 1975 a model dividing stress into eustress and distress. Where stress enhances function (physical or mental, such as through strength training or challenging work), it may be considered eustress. Persistent stress that is not resolved through coping or adaptation, deemed distress, may lead to anxiety or withdrawal (depression) behavior.

The difference between experiences that result in eustress and those that result in distress is determined by the disparity between an experience (real or imagined) and personal expectations, and resources to cope with the stress. Alarming experiences, either real or imagined, can trigger a stress response.

Coping

Responses to stress include adaptation, psychological coping such as stress management, anxiety, and depression. Over the long term, distress can lead to diminished health and/or increased propensity to illness; to avoid this, stress must be managed.

Stress management encompasses techniques intended to equip a person with effective coping mechanisms for dealing with psychological stress, with stress defined as a person's physiological response to an internal or external stimulus that triggers the fight-or-flight response. Stress management is effective when a person uses strategies to cope with or alter stressful situations.

There are several ways of coping with stress, such as controlling the source of stress or learning to set limits and to say "no" to some of the demands that bosses or family members may make.

A person's capacity to tolerate the source of stress may be increased by thinking about another topic such as a hobby, listening to music, or spending time in a wilderness.

A way to control stress is first dealing with what is causing the stress if it is something the individual has control over. Other methods to control stress and reduce it can be: to not procrastinate and leave tasks for the last minute, do things you like, exercise, do breathing routines, go out with friends, and take a break. Having support from a loved one also helps a lot in reducing stress.

One study showed that the power of having support from a loved one, or just having social support, lowered stress in individual subjects. Painful shocks were applied to married women's ankles. In some trials women were able to hold their husband's hand, in other trials they held a stranger's hand, and then held no one's hand. When the women were holding their husband's hand, the response was reduced in many brain areas. When holding the stranger's hand the response was reduced a little, but not as much as when they were holding their husband's hand. Social support helps reduce stress and even more so if the support is from a loved one.

Cognitive appraisal
Lazarus argued that, in order for a psychosocial situation to be stressful, it must be appraised as such. He argued that cognitive processes of appraisal are central in determining whether a situation is potentially threatening, constitutes a harm/loss or a challenge, or is benign.

Both personal and environmental factors influence this primary appraisal, which then triggers the selection of coping processes. Problem-focused coping is directed at managing the problem, whereas emotion-focused coping processes are directed at managing the negative emotions. Secondary appraisal refers to the evaluation of the resources available to cope with the problem, and may alter the primary appraisal.

In other words, primary appraisal includes the perception of how stressful the problem is and the secondary appraisal of estimating whether one has more than or less than adequate resources to deal with the problem that affects the overall appraisal of stressfulness. Further, coping is flexible in that, in general, the individual examines the effectiveness of the coping on the situation; if it is not having the desired effect, s/he will, in general, try different strategies.

Assessment

Health risk factors
Both negative and positive stressors can lead to stress. The intensity and duration of stress changes depending on the circumstances and emotional condition of the person with it (Arnold. E and Boggs. K. 2007). Some common categories and examples of stressors include:
 Sensory input such as pain, bright light, noise, temperatures, or environmental issues such as a lack of control over environmental circumstances, such as food, air and/or water quality, housing, health, freedom, or mobility.
 Social issues can also cause stress, such as struggles with conspecific or difficult individuals and social defeat, or relationship conflict, deception, or break ups, and major events such as birth and deaths, marriage, and divorce.
 Life experiences such as poverty, unemployment, clinical depression, obsessive compulsive disorder, heavy drinking, or insufficient sleep can also cause stress. Students and workers may face performance pressure stress from exams and project deadlines.
 Adverse experiences during development (e.g. prenatal exposure to maternal stress, poor attachment histories, sexual abuse) are thought to contribute to deficits in the maturity of an individual's stress response systems. One evaluation of the different stresses in people's lives is the Holmes and Rahe stress scale.

General adaptation syndrome

Physiologists define stress as how the body reacts to a stressor - a stimulus, real or imagined. Acute stressors affect an organism in the short term; chronic stressors over the longer term. The general adaptation syndrome (GAS), developed by Hans Selye, is a profile of how organisms respond to stress; GAS is characterized by three phases: a nonspecific mobilization phase, which promotes sympathetic nervous system activity; a resistance phase, during which the organism makes efforts to cope with the threat; and an exhaustion phase, which occurs if the organism fails to overcome the threat and depletes its physiological resources.

Stage 1
Alarm is the first stage, which is divided into two phases: the shock phase and the antishock phase.
 Shock phase: During this phase, the body can endure changes such as hypovolemia, hypoosmolarity, hyponatremia, hypochloremia, hypoglycemia—the stressor effect. This phase resembles Addison's disease. The organism's resistance to the stressor drops temporarily below the normal range and some level of shock (e.g. circulatory shock) may be experienced.
 Antishock phase: When the threat or stressor is identified or realized, the body starts to respond and is in a state of alarm. During this stage, the locus coeruleus and sympathetic nervous system activate the production of catecholamines including adrenaline, engaging the popularly-known fight-or-flight response. Adrenaline temporarily provides increased muscular tonus, increased blood pressure due to peripheral vasoconstriction and tachycardia, and increased glucose in blood. There is also some activation of the HPA axis, producing glucocorticoids (cortisol, aka the S-hormone or stress-hormone).

Stage 2
Resistance is the second stage. During this stage, increased secretion of glucocorticoids intensifies the body's systemic response. Glucocorticoids can increase the concentration of glucose, fat, and amino acid in blood. In high doses, one glucocorticoid, cortisol, begins to act similarly to a mineralocorticoid (aldosterone) and brings the body to a state similar to hyperaldosteronism. If the stressor persists, it becomes necessary to attempt some means of coping with the stress. The body attempts to respond to stressful stimuli, but after prolonged activation, the body's chemical resources will be gradually depleted, leading to the final stage.

Stage 3
The third stage could be either exhaustion or recovery:
 Recovery stage follows when the system's compensation mechanisms have successfully overcome the stressor effect (or have completely eliminated the factor which caused the stress). The high glucose, fat and amino acid levels in blood prove useful for anabolic reactions, restoration of homeostasis and regeneration of cells.
 Exhaustion is the alternative third stage in the GAS model. At this point, all of the body's resources are eventually depleted and the body is unable to maintain normal function. The initial autonomic nervous system symptoms may reappear (panic attacks, muscle aches, sore eyes, difficulty breathing, fatigue, heartburn, high blood pressure, and difficult time sleeping, etc.). If stage three is extended, long-term damage may result (prolonged vasoconstriction results in ischemia which in turn leads to cell necrosis), as the body's immune system becomes exhausted, and bodily functions become impaired, resulting in decompensation.

The result can manifest itself in obvious illnesses, such as general trouble with the digestive system (e.g. occult bleeding, melena, constipation/obstipation), diabetes, or even cardiovascular problems (angina pectoris), along with clinical depression and other mental illnesses.

Stress relief 
A person can stop stress from being overwhelming by exercising when symptoms of stress become apparent, reflecting on their day (thinking about what they accomplished, not what they have not), and speaking to a therapist about their concerns. The parasympathetic nervous system is responsible for calming down the body's arousal and helping a person relax.

History in research
The current usage of the word stress arose out of Hans Selye's 1930s experiments. He started to use the term to refer not just to the agent but to the state of the organism as it responded and adapted to the environment. His theories of a universal non-specific stress response attracted great interest and contention in academic physiology and he undertook extensive research programs and publication efforts.

While the work attracted continued support from advocates of psychosomatic medicine, many in experimental physiology concluded that his concepts were too vague and unmeasurable. During the 1950s, Selye turned away from the laboratory to promote his concept through popular books and lecture tours. He wrote for both non-academic physicians and, in an international bestseller entitled Stress of Life, for the general public.

A broad biopsychosocial concept of stress and adaptation offered the promise of helping everyone achieve health and happiness by successfully responding to changing global challenges and the problems of modern civilization. Selye coined the term "eustress" for positive stress, by contrast to distress. He argued that all people have a natural urge and need to work for their own benefit, a message that found favor with industrialists and governments. He also coined the term stressor to refer to the causative event or stimulus, as opposed to the resulting state of stress.

Selye was in contact with the tobacco industry from 1958 and they were undeclared allies in litigation and the promotion of the concept of stress, clouding the link between smoking and cancer, and portraying smoking as a "diversion", or in Selye's concept a "deviation", from environmental stress.

From the late 1960s, academic psychologists started to adopt Selye's concept; they sought to quantify "life stress" by scoring "significant life events", and a large amount of research was undertaken to examine links between stress and disease of all kinds. By the late 1970s, stress had become the medical area of greatest concern to the general population, and more basic research was called for to better address the issue. There was also renewed laboratory research into the neuroendocrine, molecular, and immunological bases of stress, conceived as a useful heuristic not necessarily tied to Selye's original hypotheses. The US military became a key center of stress research, attempting to understand and reduce combat neurosis and psychiatric casualties.

The psychiatric diagnosis post-traumatic stress disorder (PTSD) was coined in the mid-1970s, in part through the efforts of anti-Vietnam War activists and the Vietnam Veterans Against the War, and Chaim F. Shatan. The condition was added to the Diagnostic and Statistical Manual of Mental Disorders as posttraumatic stress disorder in 1980. PTSD was considered a severe and ongoing emotional reaction to an extreme psychological trauma, and as such often associated with soldiers, police officers, and other emergency personnel. The stressor may involve threat to life (or viewing the actual death of someone else), serious physical injury, or threat to physical or psychological integrity. In some cases, it can also be from profound psychological and emotional trauma, apart from any actual physical harm or threat. Often, however, the two are combined.

By the 1990s, "stress" had become an integral part of modern scientific understanding in all areas of physiology and human functioning, and one of the great metaphors of Western life. Focus grew on stress in certain settings, such as workplace stress, and stress management techniques were developed. The term also became a euphemism, a way of referring to problems and eliciting sympathy without being explicitly confessional, just "stressed out". It came to cover a huge range of phenomena from mild irritation to the kind of severe problems that might result in a real breakdown of health. In popular usage, almost any event or situation between these extremes could be described as stressful. During this time society spent less attention to the actual danger and severeness to mental health, this society might not have cared about those consequences of what we say or do. We might not agree that those consequences of being harsh to another individual verbally is to be considered abuse but they nonetheless have costs that we all pay. 

The American Psychological Association's 2015 Stress In America Study found that nationwide stress is on the rise and that the three leading sources of stress were "money", "family responsibility", and "work".

See also
 Autonomic nervous system
 Defense physiology
 HPA axis
 Plant stress measurement
 Trier social stress test
 Xenohormesis
 Stress in early childhood
 Weathering hypothesis

References

External links

The American Institute of Stress
"Research on Work-Related Stress", European Agency for Safety and Health at Work (EU-OSHA)
Coping With Stress
Stages of GAS & Evolving the Definition

 
 
Endocrine system
Sympathetic nervous system